The 2002–03 All-Ireland Junior Club Hurling Championship was the inaugural staging of the All-Ireland Junior Club Hurling Championship since its establishment by the Gaelic Athletic Association. The championship ran from 10 November 2002 to 11 May 2003.

The All-Ireland final was played on 11 May 2003 at Walsh Park in Waterford, between Ballinhassig and Blacks and Whites, in what was their first ever meeting in the final. Ballinhassig won the match by 4–15 to 1–06 to claim their first ever championship title.

Ballinhassig's Declan O'Sullivan was the championship's top scorer with 0-21.

Leinster Junior Club Hurling Championship

Leinster group 1

Group 1 table

Group 1 results

Leinster group 2

Group 2 table

Group 2 results

Leinster group 3

Group 3 table

Group 3 results

Leinster group 4

Group 4 table

Group 4 results

Leinster semi-finals

Leinster final

Munster Junior Club Hurling Championship

Munster quarter-final

Munster semi-finals

Munster final

All-Ireland Junior Club Hurling Championship

All-Ireland final

References

All-Ireland Junior Club Hurling Championship
All-Ireland Junior Club Hurling Championship
All-Ireland Junior Club Hurling Championship